Furio may refer to:

 Furio (given name), including a list of people with the name
 Furio (surname), including a list of people with the name
 Falcomposite Furio, a kit-plane

See also

 Furios (disambiguation)
 Furiosa (disambiguation)
 Furioso (disambiguation)
 Furious (disambiguation)
 Fury (disambiguation)